Trexler may refer to:

Trexler (surname)
Trexler, Berks County, Pennsylvania, an unincorporated community in Albany Township
Trexler Nature Preserve, in Lehigh County, Pennsylvania

See also
Trexlertown, Pennsylvania, a census-designated place in Lehigh County